Sidney Hartnoll Beard (1862 – 20 October 1938) was an English fruitarian, vegetarian activist and writer. He was President of the international animal rights society, the Order of the Golden Age.

Biography
Beard was born in London. He became a vegetarian in 1894. He re-established the Order of the Golden Age in 1895.   The Order's headquarters were located at Beard's residence in Ilfracombe. In 1904, the Order's new headquarters were located at Barcombe Hall in Paignton.

Beard was the editor of the Herald of the Golden Age (1896–1918), the official journal for the Order of the Golden Age. The aim of the journal was to promote the "fruitarian system of living, and to teach its advantages." The journal promoted vegetarianism from a Christian perspective. Beard believed that a vegetarian diet should be pursued as a moral duty. Charles W. Forward described Beard as having "militant enthusiasm, intense earnestness and unswerving faith".

He was married to Annie Patterson. Beard and his wife were spiritualists. He campaigned for the humane treatment of animals as part of his Christian spiritual belief system.

Beard authored A Comprehensive Guide-Book to Natural, Hygienic and Humane Diet, in 1902. The book was criticized by health writer Carl Malmberg for making extremist claims. Beard died in Putney on 20 October 1938.

Fruitarianism
Beard and Josiah Oldfield lectured on the benefits of fruitarianism at the Cambridge Guildhall Council Chamber in 1908. Similar to Oldfield, Beard's type of fruitarianism was not strict and included dairy and eggs. Beard defined fruitarianism as "systematic living upon the various fruits of the earth, instead of upon the products of the shambles." He stated that fruits of the earth included all kinds of cereals, seeds and every variety of nuts, all fruits and every kind of vegetable and this could be supplemented by dairy and egg products. Beard argued that fruitarianism helped one to live a humane and hygienic life with freedom from the butchery of animal flesh.

Selected publications
A Simple Guide to a Natural and Humane Diet (1898)
Is Flesh-Eating Morally Defensible? (1898)
A Comprehensive Guide-Book to Natural, Hygienic and Humane Diet (1902)
Our Real Relationship to God: The Lost Ideal of Christianity, by a Disciple of the Christ (1922)

References

External links
The Herald of the Golden Age

1862 births
1938 deaths
Anti-vivisectionists
British vegetarianism activists
Christian vegetarianism
English food writers
English spiritualists
English temperance activists
People associated with the Order of the Golden Age
Vegetarian cookbook writers
Writers from London